The Federal Acquisition Reform Act of 1996 was U.S. national legislation enacted as Division D of the National Defense Authorization Act for Fiscal Year 1996.  Together with the Information Technology Management Reform Act of 1996, it is known as the Clinger–Cohen Act.

References

External links
 Summary of the law at the US Congress web site 

United States federal government administration legislation
Government procurement in the United States